The 2018 Meerbusch Challenger was a professional tennis tournament played on clay courts. It was the sixth edition of the tournament which was part of the 2018 ATP Challenger Tour. It took place in Meerbusch, Germany, between 13 and 19 August 2018.

Singles main draw entrants

Seeds

 1 Rankings as of 6 August 2018.

Other entrants
The following players received wildcards into the singles main draw:
  Andreas Haider-Maurer
  Benjamin Hassan
  Ondřej Štyler
  Louis Wessels

The following player received entry into the singles main draw using a protected ranking:
  Riccardo Bellotti

The following player received entry into the singles main draw as a special exempt:
  Kevin Krawietz

The following players received entry from the qualifying draw:
  Zizou Bergs
  Nicola Kuhn
  Jelle Sels
  Marc Sieber

The following player received entry as a lucky loser:
  Alexandre Müller

Champions

Singles 

  Filip Horanský def.  Jan Choinski 6–7(7–9), 6–3, 6–3.

Doubles 

  David Pérez Sanz /  Mark Vervoort def.  Grzegorz Panfil /  Volodymyr Uzhylovskyi 3–6, 6–4, [10–7].

References

Meerbusch Challenger
2018
Meerbusch Challenger